The London Beer Flood was an accident at Meux & Co's Horse Shoe Brewery, London, on 17 October 1814. It took place when one of the  wooden vats of fermenting porter burst. The escaping liquid dislodged the valve of another vessel and destroyed several large barrels: between 128,000 and 323,000 imperial gallons (580,000–1,470,000 L; 154,000–388,000 US gal) of beer were released in total.

The resulting wave of porter destroyed the back wall of the brewery and swept into an area of slum dwellings known as the St Giles rookery. Eight people were killed, five of them mourners at the wake being held by an Irish family for a two-year-old boy. The coroner's inquest returned a verdict that the eight had lost their lives "casually, accidentally and by misfortune". The brewery was nearly bankrupted by the event; it avoided collapse after a rebate from HM Excise on the lost beer. The brewing industry gradually stopped using large wooden vats after the accident. The brewery moved in 1921, and the Dominion Theatre is now where the brewery used to stand. Meux & Co went into liquidation in 1961.

Background

In the early nineteenth century the Meux Brewery was one of the two largest in London, along with Whitbread. In 1809 Sir Henry Meux purchased the Horse Shoe Brewery, at the junction of Tottenham Court Road and Oxford Street. Meux's father, Sir Richard Meux, had previously co-owned the Griffin Brewery in Liquor-Pond Street (now Clerkenwell Road), in which he had constructed the largest vat in London, capable of holding 20,000 imperial barrels.

Meux brewed only porter, a dark beer that was first brewed in London and was the most popular alcoholic drink in the capital. Meux & Co brewed 102,493 imperial barrels in the twelve months up to July 1812. Porter was left in the large vessels to mature for several months, or up to a year for the best quality versions.

At the rear of the brewery ran New Street, a small cul-de-sac that joined on to Dyott Street; this was within the St Giles rookery. Thomas Beames, the preacher of Westminster St James, and author of the 1852 work The Rookeries of London: Past, Present and Prospective, described the St Giles rookery as "a rendezvous of the scum of society"; the area had been the inspiration for William Hogarth's 1751 print Gin Lane.

17 October 1814

At around 4:30 in the afternoon of 17 October 1814, George Crick, Meux's storehouse clerk, saw that one of the  iron bands around a vat had slipped. As the bands slipped off the vats two or three times a year, Crick was unconcerned. He told his supervisor about the problem, but was told "that no harm whatever would ensue". Crick was told to write a note to Mr Young, one of the partners of the brewery, to have it fixed later.

An hour after the hoop fell off, Crick was standing on a platform  from the vat, holding the note to Mr Young, when the vessel, with no indication, burst. The force of the liquid's release knocked the stopcock from a neighbouring vat, which also began discharging its contents; several hogsheads of porter were destroyed, and their contents added to the flood. Between 128,000 and 323,000 imperial gallons were released. Some of the bricks from the back wall were knocked upwards, and fell onto the roofs of the houses in the nearby Great Russell Street.

In one of the houses a four-year-old girl, Hannah Bamfield, was having tea with her mother and another child. The wave of beer swept the mother and the second child into the street; Hannah was killed. In the second destroyed house, a wake was being held by an Irish family for a two-year-old boy; Anne Saville, the boy's mother, and four other mourners (Mary Mulvey and her three-year-old son, Elizabeth Smith and Catherine Butler) were killed. Eleanor Cooper, a 14-year-old servant of the publican of the Tavistock Arms in Great Russell Street, died when she was buried under the brewery's collapsed wall while washing pots in the pub's yard. Another child, Sarah Bates, was found dead in another house in New Street. The land around the building was low-lying and flat. With insufficient drainage, the beer flowed into cellars, many of which were inhabited, and people were forced to climb on furniture to avoid drowning.

All those in the brewery survived, although three workmen had to be rescued from the rubble; the superintendent and one of the workers were taken to Middlesex Hospital, along with three others.

17 to 19 October
Stories later arose of hundreds of people collecting the beer, mass drunkenness and a death from alcohol poisoning a few days later. The brewing historian Martyn Cornell states that newspapers of the time made no reference to the revelry, or of the later death; instead, the newspapers reported that the crowds were well-behaved. Cornell points out that the popular press of the time did not like the immigrant Irish population that lived in St Giles, so if there had been any misbehaviour, it would have been reported.

The area surrounding the rear of the brewery showed a "scene of desolation [that] presents a most awful and terrific appearance, equal to that which fire or earthquake may be supposed to occasion". Watchmen at the brewery charged people to view the remains of the destroyed beer vats, and several hundred spectators came to view the scene. The mourners killed in the cellar were given their own wake at The Ship public house in Bainbridge Street. The other bodies were laid out in a nearby yard by their families; the public came to see them and donated money for their funerals. Collections were taken up more widely for the families.

Coroner's inquest
The coroner's inquest was held at the Workhouse of the St Giles parish on 19 October 1814; George Hodgson, the coroner for Middlesex, oversaw proceedings. The details of the victims were read out as:

Eleanor Cooper, age 14
Mary Mulvey, age 30
Thomas Murry, age 3 (Mary Mulvey's son)
Hannah Bamfield, age 4 years 4 months
Sarah Bates, age 3 years 5 months
Ann Saville, age 60
Elizabeth Smith, age 27
Catherine Butler, age 65.

Hodgson took the jurors to the scene of the events, and they viewed the brewery and bodies before evidence was taken from witnesses. The first witness was George Crick, who had seen the event happen in full; his brother was one of the men who had been injured at the brewery. Crick said that hoops on the vats failed three or four times a year, but without any previous problems. Accounts were also heard from Richard Hawse—the landlord of the Tavistock Arms, whose barmaid had been killed in the accident—and several others. The jury returned a verdict that the eight had lost their lives "casually, accidentally and by misfortune".

Later
As the coroner's inquest reached a verdict of an act of God, Meux & Co did not have to pay compensation. Nevertheless, the disaster—the lost porter, the damage to the buildings and the replacement of the vat—cost the company £23,000. After a private petition to Parliament they recovered about £7,250 from HM Excise, saving them from bankruptcy.

The Horse Shoe Brewery went back into business soon afterwards, but closed in 1921 when Meux moved their production to the Nine Elms brewery in Wandsworth, which they had purchased in 1914. At the time of its closure the site covered . The brewery was demolished the following year and the Dominion Theatre was later built on the site. Meux & Co went into liquidation in 1961. As a result of the accident, large wooden tanks were phased out across the brewing industry and replaced with lined concrete vessels.

See also

 List of non-water floods

Notes and references

Notes

References

Sources

Books

Journals

Newspapers

Internet
 
 
 
 
 
 
 
 
 

1814 disasters in the United Kingdom
1814 in London
1814 industrial disasters
Brewing in London
Disasters in London
Food processing disasters
History of the London Borough of Camden
October 1814 events
Regency London
1814 floods in the United Kingdom